Robinson Terminal Warehouse LLC is a warehouse and logistics company based in Springfield, Virginia.  Founded in 1939 by Clarence J. Robinson, the company primarily handled newsprint for The Washington Post, its owner until 2013. Robinson operated two deep-water berths alongside the Potomac River, one at the terminus of Oronoco Street, the other at the terminus of Duke Street. A railroad spur served the Oronoco facility.  Vessels heading to or from the berths passed under the Woodrow Wilson Bridge, sometimes requiring the bridge's drawspan to open.  In September 2013, the Washington Post Company sold the two waterfront facilities to real estate developers Nash Holdings.

The company also operates two warehouse facilities in Springfield, Virginia.  One of the Springfield warehouses is located along the Inner Loop of the Capital Beltway, and is frequently used as a landmark in local traffic reports.  The Springfield facility is serviced by Norfolk Southern Railroad. Another warehouse facility was located at The Washington Posts printing plant in College Park, Maryland. The College Park plant was sold to the University of Maryland in 2010.

References

External links
 

Companies based in Fairfax County, Virginia
Transportation in Alexandria, Virginia
American companies established in 1939
1939 establishments in Virginia
The Washington Post
Springfield, Virginia
Transport companies established in 1939